Livingstone District is a district of Zambia, located in Southern Province. The capital lies at Livingstone, Zambia. As of the 2000 Zambian Census, the district had a population of 103,288 people. Its border with Zimbabwe is formed by the Zambezi River and Victoria Falls. Although most people live in Livingstone, other villages include Jinga Jinga in the north and Simonga in the southwest.

Transportation
The Zambia road of M10 from Kazungula and Sesheke in the west, after passing through Simonga, reaches a junction with the T1 road in the city of Livingstone at a junction adjacent to St. Theresa's Catholic Church and Mosi-Oa-Tunya Square (at a 4-way traffic light junction). The T1 then continues either south to cross over Victoria Falls Bridge into Zimbabwe or north-east towards Zimba, Choma and Lusaka.

Harry Mwanga Nkumbula International Airport serves Livingstone and is connected to the downtown by Libala Drive (often known and labelled as "Airport Road"). The airport is controlled by the National Airports Corporation Limited.

Health and education
Hospitals in the district include Batoka Hospital and Livingstone General Hospital (Which Are Neighbouring Hospitals And Are Often Treated As One Hospital). Schools include Nalituwe Primary School, Libala Primary School, St. Mary's Secondary School, St. Raphael's Secondary School, Shungu School, Mujala School, and Linda High School.

Victoria Falls
Africa's highest waterfall, Victoria Falls, is found in the Livingstone District. Located by Mosi-oa-Tunya National Park, the waterfalls cascade past Livingstone Island along the Zambezi River. Then, the river passes underneath Victoria Falls Bridge on the road T1. Victoria Falls forms part of the district's border with Zimbabwe.

References

Districts of Southern Province, Zambia